Semi-linear response theory (SLRT) is an extension of linear response theory (LRT) for mesoscopic circumstances: LRT applies if the driven transitions are much weaker/slower than the environmental relaxation/dephasing effect, while SLRT assumes the opposite conditions. SLRT uses a resistor network analogy (see illustration) in order to calculate the rate of energy absorption: The driving induces transitions between energy levels, and connected sequences of transitions are essential in order to have a non-vanishing result, as in the theory of percolation.

Applications
The original motivation for introducing SLRT was the study of mesosopic conductance

.
The term SLRT has been coined in

where it has been applied to the calculation of energy absorption by metallic grains.
Later the theory has been applied for analysing the rate of heating of atoms in vibrating traps
.

Definition of semilinear response
Consider a system that is driven by a source  that has
a power spectrum . The latter is defined
In linear response theory (LRT) the driving source induces a steady state
which is only slightly different from the equilibrium state.
In such circumstances the response is a linear functional of the power spectrum:

 

In the traditional LRT context  represents the rate of heating,
and  can be defined as the absorption coefficient.
Whenever such relation applies

 

 

If the driving is very strong the response becomes non-linear, meaning that both properties [A] and [B] do not hold.  But there is a class of systems whose response becomes semi-linear, i.e. the first property [A] still holds, but not [B].

Resistor network modeling
SLRT applies whenever the driving is strong enough such that relaxation to the steady state is slow compared with the driven dynamics.
The notation  stands for the usual electrical engineering calculation of a two terminal conductance of a given resistor network.  For example parallel connections imply , while serial connections imply  . Resistor network calculation is manifestly semi-linear because it satisfies , but in general .

Fermi golden rule picture
In the quantum mechanical calculation of energy absorption, the  represent Fermi-golden-rule transition rates between energy levels. If only neighboring levels are coupled, serial addition implies

 

which is manifestly semi-linear. Results for sparse networks, that are encountered in the analysis of weakly chaotic driven systems,
are more interesting and can be obtained using a generalized variable range hopping (VRH) scheme.

References 

Quantum mechanics
Statistical mechanics
Non-equilibrium thermodynamics